Filipești is a commune in Bacău County, Western Moldavia, Romania. It is composed of eight villages: Boanța, Cârligi, Cornești, Cotu Grosului, Filipești, Galbeni, Hârlești and Onișcani.

Famous landmarks

 In the village of Cârligi lies the Zarifopol mansion built in 1850 by Ștefan Catargiu which is rumored to be haunted ever since one of its owners committed suicide inside the building. The locals refer to it as "Casa Diavolului" ("House of the Devil").

Natives
 Radu Beligan

References

Communes in Bacău County
Localities in Western Moldavia